The Ould Lammas Fair is a traditional fair held in Ballycastle, County Antrim, Northern Ireland, every year on the last Monday and Tuesday of August. It is associated with the Lammas harvest festival.

The fair has been running for nearly 400 years, dating back to the 17th century.

Various goods are traditionally sold at the fair. These include livestock and traditional foods such as Yellowman, a local variant of honeycomb and dulse, a type of edible seaweed.

A ballad, The Ould Lammas Fair in Ballycastle O, was written by local shopkeeper and bog oak carver John Henry MacAuley and enhanced the local fame of the fair. MacAuley was also a well known fiddler, but died in 1937 before his song became famous.

On 28 August 2001 a Royal Ulster Constabulary officer discovered a large incendiary bomb in the centre of Ballycastle whilst the fair was running. After the area was cleared British Army bomb disposal experts defused the device. The attempted attack was initially claimed by the Red Hand Defenders. However, the RUC later suggested that it was carried out by the Ulster Volunteer Force.

No fairs were held in 1915–18 nor 1940–45. The 2020 and 2021 editions of the fair were cancelled due to the COVID-19 pandemic.

References

External links 

Annual fairs
Tourist attractions in County Antrim
Public holidays in the United Kingdom
Fairs in Northern Ireland
Annual events in the United Kingdom
August events
Summer events in Northern Ireland